"The Great Wave" is the fourth episode of the first season of the American fantasy television series The Lord of the Rings: The Rings of Power, based on the novel The Lord of the Rings and its appendices by J. R. R. Tolkien. Set in the Second Age of Middle-earth, thousands of years before Tolkien's The Hobbit and The Lord of the Rings, it follows a large cast of characters. The episode was written by Stephany Folsom and showrunners J. D. Payne and Patrick McKay, and directed by Wayne Che Yip.

Amazon made a multi-season commitment for a new The Lord of the Rings series in November 2017. Payne and McKay were set to develop it in July 2018. Filming for the first season took place in New Zealand, and work on episodes beyond the first two began in January 2021. Yip was revealed to be directing four episodes of the season that March, including the fourth episode. Production wrapped for the season in August 2021.

"The Great Wave" premiered on the streaming service Amazon Prime Video on September 16, 2022. It was estimated to have high viewership and received generally positive reviews.

Plot 
Míriel has a vision of Númenor being destroyed by a giant tsunami. Galadriel and Elendil present Míriel with proof that the forces of Sauron are attacking the Southlands in Middle-earth and Galadriel asks her to intervene. Míriel refuses and Galadriel asks to speak with her father, King Tar-Palantir, who hasn't been seen in years. Míriel has Galadriel imprisoned. Isildur and his friends Valandil and Ontamo are dismissed from their cadet training after Isildur makes a costly mistake.

Arondir meets Adar, the leader and "father" of the Orcs who is an Elf. He lets Arondir leave with a message for the Southlanders who are taking refuge in the Elven watchtower of Ostirith: forsake their claims to the Southlands and swear fealty to Adar, or they will be destroyed. Meanwhile, Theo wants to be helpful but is ignored by Bronwyn. He and Rowan return to Tirharad to recover food from the tavern and are attacked by Orcs. Rowan escapes back to the tower while Theo is forced to hide in a well.

In Eregion, the Elves and Dwarves are working together to build Celebrimbor's powerful new forge. Celebrimbor believes Durin IV is hiding something, and Elrond goes to investigate. He learns that Durin has been mining a new ore that is very light and very strong below Khazad-dûm. Elrond promises to keep this secret and gives it the name "mithril". When the mine collapses, King Durin III shuts down further mithril mining. Durin IV is furious at his father, but Elrond calms him with a story of his own father, Eärendil, who became a star. Durin IV reconciles with his father, who sends him to Lindon to find out what the Elves' intentions are.

Halbrand helps Galadriel realize that she should go around Míriel and speak to Tar-Palantir directly. Guards arrive to release Galadriel and escort her to Middle-earth, but Galadriel escapes and climbs up the king's tower. She finds the king in ill health, protected by Míriel. The latter explains that there was a rebellion because the king wanted to renew relations with the Elves, and Míriel was placed on the throne in his stead. After becoming ruler, Míriel was given access to a palantír (crystal ball) that first showed her the vision of Númenor's downfall. She shows this vision to Galadriel and explains her belief that helping Galadriel will bring upon this cataclysmic future.

Arondir rescues Theo from the Orcs and they return to the tower. Tavern owner Waldreg reveals to Theo that he is a servant of Sauron and explains that the broken sword was a gift for the followers of the Dark Lord. The Orcs who attacked Theo know he has the sword and report back to Adar that it is in the tower.

As Galadriel departs for Middle-earth, the petals of Númenor's White Tree begin to fall. Míriel says this signifies the tears of the Valar and changes her mind. She announces that she will personally escort Galadriel to Middle-earth and assist the Men of the Southlands. Isildur, Valandil, and Ontamo volunteer to join the expeditionary force.

Production

Development 
Amazon acquired the global television rights for J. R. R. Tolkien's The Lord of the Rings in November 2017. The company's streaming service, Amazon Prime Video, gave a multi-season commitment to a series based on the novel and its appendices, to be produced by Amazon Studios. It was later titled The Lord of the Rings: The Rings of Power. Amazon hired J. D. Payne and Patrick McKay to develop the series and serve as showrunners in July 2018. Stephany Folsom had joined the series as a writer by July 2019, and Wayne Che Yip was revealed to be directing four episodes of the first season in March 2021. The series is set in the Second Age of Middle-earth, thousands of years before the events of Tolkien's The Hobbit and The Lord of the Rings, and the first season focuses on introducing the setting and major heroic characters to the audience. Written by Folsom, Payne, and McKay, and directed by Yip, the fourth episode is titled "The Great Wave".

Casting 

The series' large cast includes Cynthia Addai-Robinson as Míriel, Robert Aramayo as Elrond, Owain Arthur as Durin IV, Maxim Baldry as Isildur, Nazanin Boniadi as Bronwyn, Morfydd Clark as Galadriel, Ismael Cruz Córdova as Arondir, Charles Edwards as Celebrimbor, Trystan Gravelle as Pharazôn, Ema Horvath as Eärien, Tyroe Muhafidin as Theo, Sophia Nomvete as Disa, Lloyd Owen as Elendil, Charlie Vickers as Halbrand, and Leon Wadham as Kemen. Also starring are Anthony Crum as Ontamo, Alex Tarrant as Valandil, Peter Tait as Tredwill, Geoff Morrell as Waldreg, Ian Blackburn as Rowan, Ken Blackburn as Tar-Palantir, Peter Mullan as Durin III, Laura Medes as young mother, Carmel McGlone as Edda, Jason Hood as Tamar, Adam Faiz as guild merchant, Antonio Te Maioha as sail master, Phil Grieve as Bazur, Luke Hawker as Magrot, Jed Brophy as Vrath, and Edward Clendon as Grugzûk.

Filming 
Amazon confirmed in September 2019 that filming for the first season would take place in New Zealand, where the Lord of the Rings and Hobbit film trilogies were made. Filming primarily took place at Kumeu Film Studios and Auckland Film Studios in Auckland, under the working title Untitled Amazon Project or simply UAP. Production on episodes beyond the first two began in January 2021, and Yip confirmed that he had begun filming his episodes by March. Filming for the season wrapped on August 2.

Visual effects 
Visual effects for the episode were created by Industrial Light & Magic (ILM), Wētā FX, Method Studios, Rodeo FX, DNEG, Cause and FX, Atomic Arts, and Cantina Creative. The different vendors were overseen by visual effects supervisor Jason Smith. The palantír effect was created by Rodeo, based on a design suggestion by Smith that the crystal and its surrounding environment could fracture to reveal a vision. He came to this idea by thinking of the divisive nature of the vision and the potential connection between the palantír and Tolkien's unseen world. Rodeo described this as linking two scenes with a broken glass effect.

Music 

A soundtrack album featuring composer Bear McCreary's score for the episode was released on Amazon Music on September 15, 2022. McCreary said the album contained "virtually every second of score" from the episode. It was added to other music streaming services after the full first season was released. All music composed by Bear McCreary:

Release 
"The Great Wave" premiered on Prime Video in the United States on September 16, 2022. It was released at the same time around the world, in more than 240 countries and territories.

Reception

Viewership 
Software company Whip Media, who track viewership data for the 21 million worldwide users of their TV Time app, calculated that for the week ending September 18, two days after the episode's debut, The Rings of Power was the third-highest original streaming series for U.S. viewership behind Netflix's Cobra Kai and Disney+'s She-Hulk: Attorney at Law. JustWatch, a guide to streaming content with access to data from more than 20 million users around the world, placed it sixth on their list of top 10 streaming series in the U.S. for the week ending September 18. Nielsen Media Research, who record streaming viewership on U.S. television screens, estimated that the series was watched for 988 million minutes during the week ending September 18. This was a drop from the previous two weeks, but the series moved up to second-place on the company's list of top streaming series and films, behind only Cobra Kai. Parrot Analytics determines audience "demand expressions" based on various data sources, including social media activity and comments on rating platforms. During the week ending September 23, the company calculated that The Rings of Power was 27.2 times more in demand than the average U.S. streaming series, placing it tenth on the company's top 10 list for the week.

Critical response 

The review aggregator website Rotten Tomatoes reported an 84% approval rating with an average score of 6.8/10 based on 31 reviews. The website's critics consensus reads: "'The Great Wave' is an awkwardly sluggish mid-point for a season still searching for momentum, but the slow pacing doesn't wash away glittering virtues like awe-inspiring visuals and impressively detailed world-building."

Companion media 
An episode of the official aftershow Deadline's Inside the Ring: LOTR: The Rings of Power for "The Great Wave" was released on September 17, 2022. Hosted by Deadline Hollywood Dominic Patten and Anthony D'Alessandro, it features exclusive "footage and insights" for the episode, plus interviews with cast members Córdova, Boniadi, Addai-Robinson, Gravelle, Muhafidin, and Baldry, as well as Yip, Doble, and dialect coach Leith McPherson. On October 14, The Official The Lord of the Rings: The Rings of Power Podcast was released on Amazon Music. Hosted by actress Felicia Day, the fourth episode is dedicated to "The Great Wave" and features Arthur, Nomvete, Payne, and McKay. On November 21, a bonus segment featuring behind-the-scenes footage from the episode was added to Prime Video's X-Ray feature as part of a series titled "The Making of The Rings of Power".

References

External links 
 

2022 American television episodes
The Lord of the Rings: The Rings of Power